Maximilian Ahlschwede (born 10 February 1990) is a German former professional footballer who plays as a right-back for TuS Dassendorf. During his career he played, among others, for the 3. Liga sides of SV Wehen Wiesbaden, Würzburger Kickers and FC Hansa Rostock.

Career
In late January 2015, his contract with SV Wehen Wiesbaden was dissolved and he moved to fellow 3. Liga side Hansa Rostock. In 2017 he moved to Würzburger Kickers on a two-year contract but returned to Rostock afterwards.

In May 2020 he extended his contract with Rostock by one more year but later in July he decided for family reasons to dissolve the contract and quit professional football.

References

External links

1990 births
Living people
People from Bad Oldesloe
German footballers
Footballers from Schleswig-Holstein
Association football fullbacks
3. Liga players
Regionalliga players
Arminia Bielefeld players
VfL Wolfsburg II players
Kickers Offenbach players
SV Wehen Wiesbaden players
FC Hansa Rostock players
Würzburger Kickers players
TuS Dassendorf players